Eutetrapha laosensis is a species of beetle in the family Cerambycidae. It was described by Stephan von Breuning in 1965. It is known from Laos and Vietnam.

References

Saperdini
Beetles described in 1965